Luis Manuel Orejuela García (born 20 August 1995) is a Colombian professional footballer who plays as a right-back for Brazilian club São Paulo.

Club career

Deportivo Cali
Born in Cali, Orejuela represented Deportivo Cali as a youth. He made his first team debut on 7 August 2013 at the age of 18, starting in a 1–1 Copa Colombia away draw against Unión Magdalena.

Orejuela made his Categoría Primera A debut on 5 April 2014, playing the full 90 minutes in a 1–0 away loss against Millonarios. Initially a backup option, he became a regular starter for the club from the 2016 season onwards; he scored his first senior goal on 20 November of that year, netting the opener in a 3–1 away defeat of Rionegro Águilas.

Ajax
On 11 August 2017, Orejuela moved abroad and signed a five-year contract with Eredivisie side Ajax. Initially assigned to the reserves in Eerste Divisie, he made his first team debut on 20 September, starting in a 5–1 away routing of SVV Scheveningen for the KNVB Cup.

Orejuela made his debut in the Eredivisie on 17 December 2017, coming on as a half-time substitute for Deyovaisio Zeefuik in a 2–1 away win over AZ Alkmaar.

Cruzeiro
On 8 January 2019, Orejuela joined Cruzeiro on loan until December. Initially a backup to Edílson, he became a regular starter as his side suffered relegation for the first time in the club's history. At the end of the year, Cruzeiro exercised their option to sign Orejuela, paying $1.5 million for 50% of his rights.

Grêmio (loan)
On 17 January 2020, Orejuela joined Grêmio on loan.

São Paulo 
On 11 March 2021, Orejuela signed with São Paulo.

International career
Orejuela represented Colombia at under-20 level before receiving a call up to the full side on 13 March 2019, for two friendlies against Japan and South Korea. He made his full international debut on 26 March, starting in a 2–1 loss against the latter.

Career statistics

Club

International

Honours
Deportivo Cali
Categoría Primera A: 2015 Apertura
Superliga Colombiana: 2014

Jong Ajax
Eerste Divisie: 2017–18

Cruzeiro
Campeonato Mineiro: 2019

Grêmio
Campeonato Gaúcho: 2020

São Paulo
Campeonato Paulista: 2021

References

External links

1995 births
Living people
Colombian footballers
Colombia under-20 international footballers
Colombia international footballers
Categoría Primera A players
Eredivisie players
Eerste Divisie players
Campeonato Brasileiro Série A players
Campeonato Brasileiro Série B players
Deportivo Cali footballers
AFC Ajax players
Jong Ajax players
Cruzeiro Esporte Clube players
Grêmio Foot-Ball Porto Alegrense players
São Paulo FC players
Club Athletico Paranaense players
Colombian expatriate footballers
Colombian expatriate sportspeople in the Netherlands
Expatriate footballers in the Netherlands
Expatriate footballers in Brazil
People from Cauca Department
Association football defenders
Footballers from Cali